Aalto University School of Engineering is part of Aalto University. It is one of the four new schools of technology established on 1 January 2011 from Aalto University School of Science and Technology, formerly known as Helsinki University of Technology. The four new schools continue to offer education and research that promotes advances in science and technology. The Department of Architecture was part of the School of Engineering until 2012, when it was restructured into the Aalto University School of Arts, Design and Architecture.

The School of Engineering teaches and researches sustainable development, global warming, energy conservation and clean energy, and the sustainable use of natural resources. In 2018, Aalto University had a World University Ranking of 140, and was ranked 9th overall in the Top 50 under 50.

The School operates in the fields of applied mechanics, civil and environmental engineering, energy and HVAC technology, mechanical engineering,  real estate economics, geomatics, structural engineering and building technology, and urban and regional studies.

Departments 
 Department of Applied Mechanics
 Department of Civil and Environmental Engineering
 Department of Civil and Structural Engineering
 Department of Energy Technology
 Department of Engineering Design and Production
 Department of Real Estate, Planning and Geoinformatics

Other units
 Center for Energy Technology (CET)

International Master´s degree programmes (2012-2013) 
Environomical Pathways for Sustainable Energy Systems (SELECT) (Erasmus Mundus)
Creative Sustainability
Managing Spatial Change
Real Estate Investment and Finance
Structural Engineering
Mechanical Engineering
Minerals and Environmental Programme (EMMEP)
Nordic Master Programme in Environmental Engineering
Nordic Master Programme in Innovative and Sustainable Energy Engineering
Nordic Master Programme in Maritime Engineering

Notable alumni

References

External links 
 Home pages of Aalto University School of Engineering

Aalto University
Educational institutions established in 2011
2011 establishments in Finland